Trần Văn Vũ (born 7 January 1992) is a Vietnamese footballer who plays as a centre-back for V.League 2 club Khánh Hòa.

References

1992 births
Living people
Vietnamese footballers
Khanh Hoa FC players
Association football central defenders